Mendon is a city in Cache County, Utah, United States. The population was 1,282 at the 2010 census. It is included in the Logan, Utah-Idaho Metropolitan Statistical Area.

History
Mendon was settled in 1859. James G. Willie, leader of the ill-fated Mormon handcart pioneer company known as the Willie Company, was one of the early settlers of Mendon. He served at times as mayor and postmaster of the town.

The Forster Hotel is one of nine sites in Mendon listed on the National Register of Historic Places.

Geography
According to the United States Census Bureau, the city has a total area of 1.2 square miles (3.2 km2), all land.

Mendon is located within the Cache Valley.

Demographics

As of the census of 2000, there were 898 people, 267 households, and 233 families residing in the city. The racial makeup of the city was 96.77% White, 1.22% Native American, 1.11% from other races, and 0.89% from two or more races. Hispanic or Latino of any race were 2.00% of the population.

There were 267 households, out of which 50.2% had children under the age of 18 living with them, 80.1% were married couples living together, 4.9% had a female householder with no husband present, and 12.4% were non-families. 11.6% of all households were made up of individuals, and 3.0% had someone living alone who was 65 years of age or older. The average household size was 3.36 and the average family size was 3.65.

In the city, the population was spread out, with 35.9% under the age of 18, 11.9% from 18 to 24, 23.7% from 25 to 44, 21.3% from 45 to 64, and 7.2% who were 65 years of age or older. The median age was 26 years. For every 100 females, there were 102.3 males. For every 100 females age 18 and over, there were 100.0 males.

The median income for a household in the city was $46,563, and the median income for a family was $51,528. Males had a median income of $39,375 versus $20,795 for females. The per capita income for the city was $15,906. About 2.4% of families and 3.8% of the population were below the poverty line, including 3.1% of those under age 18 and 9.8% of those age 65 or over.

Education
Mountainside Elementary part of the Cache County School district.

Notable people
 Ivan J. Barrett, author, professor, and historian of the Church of Jesus Christ of Latter-day Saints.
 Harvey Hancock, aviation executive, journalist, and Republican political organizer.
  Michael J. Murphy, master builder in Carmel-by-the-Sea, California
 Stephen L Richards, leader in The Church of Jesus Christ of Latter-day Saints, member of Quorum of the Twelve Apostles, and First Counselor in the First Presidency.

See also

 List of cities and towns in Utah

References

External links

 
 Historical images and documents from the Mendon, Utah Digital Collection: Utah State University

Cities in Cache County, Utah
Cities in Utah
Logan metropolitan area
Populated places established in 1859
1859 establishments in Utah Territory